Lviv Oblast, also referred to as Lvivshchyna, is an oblast in western Ukraine. The administrative center of the oblast is the city of Lviv. The current population is

History

Name
The region is named after the city of Lviv which was founded by Daniel of Galicia, the King of Ruthenia, in the 13th century, where it became the capital of Galicia-Volhynia. Daniel named the city after his son, Leo. During this time, the general region around Lviv was known as Red Ruthenia (Cherven' Rus').

Early history
The oblast's strategic position at the heart of central Europe and as the gateway to the Carpathians has caused it to change hands many times over the centuries. It was ruled variously by Great Moravia, Kievan Rus', Poland, was independent as the state of Galicia-Volhynia (circa 1200 to 1340), and then ruled by the Polish–Lithuanian Commonwealth (1340 to 1772), the Austro-Hungarian Empire (1772 to 1918), West Ukrainian People's Republic and Poland (1919 to 1939), when it was part of the Lwów Voivodeship of the Second Republic of Poland. The region's historically dominant Ukrainian population declared the area to be a part of an independent West Ukrainian National Republic in November 1918 — June 1919, but this endured only briefly. Local autonomy was provided in international treaties but later on those were not honoured by the Polish government and the area experienced much ethnic tension between the Polish and Ukrainian population.

Establishment
The oblast was created as part of the Ukrainian Soviet Socialist Republic on 4 December 1939 following the Soviet invasion of eastern Poland and annexation of Eastern Galicia and Volhynia.

It was occupied by Nazi Germany from 1941 to 1944 following the start of Operation Barbarossa, where most of the local Jewish population were killed. Following the end of World War II, the region remained in Soviet hands as was arranged in the Tehran and Yalta conferences. Local Poles were expelled and Ukrainians expelled from Poland arrived.

In 1959, Drohobych Oblast was incorporated into Lviv Oblast.

Present day
Given its historical development, Lviv Oblast is one of the least Russified and Sovietized parts of Ukraine, with much of its Polish and Habsburg heritage still visible today.

In Ukraine today, there are three provinces (oblasts) that formed the eastern part of the Kingdom of Galicia and Lodomeria. Two of these, Lviv Oblast and Ivano-Frankivsk Oblast were entirely contained in the kingdom; the third oblast of Ternopil was mainly in the kingdom apart from four of its most northerly counties (raions). The counties of the Kingdom of Galicia remained largely unchanged when they were incorporated into successor states; with minor changes as detailed below, the current counties are almost co-extensive with those of the Kingdom.

During the 2014 Euromaidan protests, the region is also notable for having declared independence from the central government led by Viktor Yanukovych who started to use active military force against protestors.

Geography
The terrain of Lviv Oblast is highly varied. The southern part is occupied by the low Beskyd (Ukrainian: Бескиди) mountain chains running parallel to each other from northwest to southeast and covered with secondary coniferous forests as part of the Eastern Carpathians; the highest point is Pikuy (1408 m). North from there are the wide upper Dniester river valley and much smaller upper San River valley. These rivers have flat bottoms covered with alluvial deposits, and are susceptible to floods. Between these valleys and Beskyd lies the Precarpathian upland covered with deciduous forests, with well-known mineral spa resorts (see Truskavets, Morshyn). It's also the area of one of the earliest industrial petroleum and gas extraction. These deposits are all but depleted by now.

In the central part of the region lie Roztocze, Opillia, and part of the Podolia uplands. Rich sulphur deposits were mined here during the Soviet era. Roztocze is densely forested, while Opillia and Podolia (being covered with loess on which fertile soils develop) are densely populated and mostly covered by arable land. In the central-north part of the region lies the Small Polesia lowland, geographically isolated from the rest of Polesia but with similar terrain and landscapes (flat plains with sandy fluvioglacial deposits and pine forests). The far North of the region lies on the Volhynia upland, which is also covered with loess; coal is mined in this area.

Climate
The climate of Lviv Oblast is moderately cool and humid. Prolonged droughts are uncommon, while strong rainfalls can cause floods in river valleys. Severe winds during storms can also cause damage, especially in the highlands. The climate is favourable for the cultivation of sugar beets, winter wheat, flax, rye, cabbage, apples, and for dairy farming. It is still too cold to successfully cultivate maize, sunflower, grapes, melon, watermelon or peaches in Lviv Oblast. In the Carpathians conditions are favourable for Alpine skiing 3–4 months a year.

Politics

Governors
Chairmen of the Executive Committee

Representative of the President

Heads of the Administration

Subdivisions

Lviv Oblast was administratively subdivided into 20 raions (districts), as well as 9 city (municipalities) which are directly subordinate to the oblast government: Boryslav, Chervonohrad, Drohobych, Morshyn, Novyi Rozdil, Sambir, Stryi, Truskavets, and the administrative center of the oblast, Lviv.

Demographics
 Male/female ratio: 48%/52%
 Nationalities (2001): 94.8% of the region's population are Ukrainians; 3.6% (or 92,600 people) are Russians; Poles account for 0.7%; there are also smaller German, Jewish and Romani minorities. Notably, the comparison of the 2001 Ukrainian census (mentioned above), with the last Soviet census of 1989 reveals that in those 12 years the number of Poles in the Lviv Oblast declined by 29.7 percent which, in the opinion of "Wspólnota Polska" Society defies explanation, and could possibly be attributed to the intensive Ukrainization of the Roman Catholic Church.

Age structure
 0-14 years: 15.7%  (male 202,923/female 193,000)
 15-64 years: 70.0%  (male 867,699/female 897,788)
 65 years and over: 14.3%  (male 122,906/female 238,016) (2013 official)

Median age
 total: 38.0 years 
 male: 35.2 years 
 female: 40.9 years  (2013 official)

Religion
Fifty-nine percent of the religious organisations active in the Lviv Oblast adhere to the Ukrainian Greek Catholic Church. The Ukrainian Autocephalous Orthodox Church is the second largest religious body. The followers of the Roman Catholic Church and the Ukrainian Orthodox Church (Moscow Patriarchate) are mostly from the Polish, and Russian or non-Galician Ukrainian minorities respectively.

Historical and cultural sites
The city of Lviv contains a well-preserved main square (Rynok) and numerous historical and beautiful churches. Other sites of interest are the historic Lychakivskiy Cemetery, the local museum of folklore, and the ruins of the famous Vysokyi Zamok. The name of the castle is closely tied to the name of the city. There is also a museum of military artifacts, the "Arsenal".

Well-preserved local wooden churches, castles, and monasteries can be found throughout the Oblast. One of them is the Olesko Castle which is first recorded in 1327. Another castle that was built at the end of the 15th century is Svirzh Castle in the village of Svirzh, Peremeshliany Raion. One more and no less famous castle is the Pidhirtsi Castle. Its architectural complex consists of the three-story palace, Kostel, and small park. In Roztochia is also located the Krekhivsky monastery in the buch-pine grove at the foot of the Pobiyna mount. The whole complex consists of the Saint Nikola Church, the bell tower, numerous service structures, and defensive walls with towers. Another site worth of mentioning is the Tustan city-fortress which is built in the rock. The site was nominated as the historical and as the natural wonder of Ukraine. There also a nature complex in the valley of the Kamianka river in Skoliv Raion. Another natural wonder of the region is the Kamin-Veleten (Rock-Giant in English) which is located near city of Pidkamin in Zolochiv Raion. The name of the local city means Under the Rock. A local museum of Ukrainian art and an institution of higher learning (Ivan Franko State University) are also present.

Gallery

Economy 
The most important research into cereal epidemics in the country is undertaken here. The National Academy of Agrarian Sciences of Ukraine's Institute of Agriculture in Obroshino is the center of study for cereal pathogens including powdery mildew of barley. In the early 2000s the most active researchers here were Olga Vronska and G. Kosilovich at the IoA. Puccinia recondita, Erysiphe graminis, (syn. Blumeria graminis) and various Pseudocercosporella spp. are present and are significant in winter wheat in this oblast.

Two introduced banded land snails, the Grove Snail (Cepaea nemoralis) and White-Lipped Snail (C. hortensis) are found here. C. n. was intentionally brought here in the late 1800s, but the genetic analysis of Gural-Sverlova et al., 2021 shows continued introductions have also occurred ever since. (The geographic distribution of both suggests they arrive through the gardening trade, as is known from other countries.) This analysis shows several distinct arrivals of C. n. yielding several present-day populations in and around Lviv.

See also
 List of Canadian place names of Ukrainian origin – Ukrainian immigrants to Canada brought place names from this oblast with them to Alberta, Manitoba, and Saskatchewan.
 Poland’s Lwów Voivodeship (1921–1939)
 Subdivisions of Ukraine

References

 Source for statistics used: L'viv Regional State Administration Web Site – accessed February 29, 2004.

External links

 L'viv Regional State Administration Web Site
 Symbols and flags

 
Oblasts of Ukraine
States and territories established in 1939
1939 establishments in Ukraine